William M. Graham (September 8, 1819 Minisink, Orange County, New York – November 13, 1886  Middletown, Orange Co., NY) was an American banker, convicted felon and Democratic politician from New York.

Life
In 1841, he began to work for the Middletown Bank, first as Teller, and from 1844 on as Cashier. He was Treasurer of Orange County from 1855 to 1860. In 1860, he became President of the Wallkill Bank, later the Wallkill National Bank.

He was a member of the New York State Senate (10th D.) from 1868 to 1871, sitting in the 91st, 92nd, 93rd and 94th New York State Legislatures.

In 1872, the Wallkill National Bank went bankrupt. An investigation showed that $256,000 of the bank's funds and about $100,000 worth of securities deposited in the bank were missing, the money having been "dissipated in Wall Street" by Graham and Cashier Charles H. Horton. Graham was convicted of fraud and embezzlement, and sentenced to ten years imprisonment at hard labor. He served about four years in Clinton State Prison and was pardoned by President Rutherford B. Hayes in 1877. Afterwards he worked as an attendant at the Middletown State Homeopathic Hospital.

He died of Bright's disease.

Sources
 The New York Civil List compiled by Franklin Benjamin Hough, Stephen C. Hutchins and Edgar Albert Werner (1870; pg. 444 and 555)
 Life Sketches of the State Officers, Senators, and Members of the Assembly of the State of New York in 1868 by S. R. Harlow & S. C. Hutchins (pg. 87f)
 TWEED AND GRAHAM in NYT on May 23, 1877
 A CHECKERED CAREER ENDED in NYT on November 15, 1886

1819 births
1886 deaths
Democratic Party New York (state) state senators
People from Minisink, New York
American bankers
Politicians convicted of embezzlement
Deaths from nephritis
American politicians convicted of fraud
Recipients of American presidential pardons
New York (state) politicians convicted of crimes
19th-century American politicians
19th-century American businesspeople